Odyneromyia spadix is a species of hoverfly in the family Syrphidae.

Distribution
Australia.

References

Eristalinae
Insects described in 1921
Diptera of Australasia